Mika (I) from the kindred Ják (died after 1202) was a Hungarian influential lord in the Kingdom of Hungary at the turn of the 12th and 13th centuries.

Family
Mika (also Mike or Michael) belonged to the gens Ják, he was the first known member of the Jákmonostor branch. He had at least two children from his unidentified wife: Csépán I, who served as Ban of Slavonia from 1206 to 1207 and died without heirs, as his only son Stephen became a monk, giving up his secular life and family name. Mika's second son Ivan had two sons (Martin I and James) thus the later members of the Jákmonostor branch descended from him. Mika founded the Pornó Abbey but the monastery itself was finished only by his son Csépán.

Career
He served as Master of the treasury in 1198, when this dignity was still a non-permanent position without defined and circumscribed jurisdiction, thus the office was only stabilized during the reign of Andrew II of Hungary. Mika also held the office of ispán of Bihar County between 1198 and 1199. In 1199, he was appointed Judge royal, replacing Peter, son of Töre.

When Palatine Mog participated in Duke Andrew's conspiracy, Emeric, King of Hungary dismissed and replaced him with Mika Ják. However the appointment proved to be complicated procedure. According to Emeric's letter to Pope Innocent III, Mika was excommunicated by Elvin, Bishop of Várad because he had formerly captured one of the bishopric's priests, who functioned as a messenger of the King's enemies who supported Duke Andrew. Later Pope Innocent III ordered the Hungarian prelates not to degrade the excommunication as a political weapon, as a result Mika was able to reserve his office, who also served as ispán of Bács County (1199–1200), which presumably was the first ex officio ispánate of the Palatine dignity, and after that head of Bihar County (1200–1201). According to a non-authentic charter, Mika held the office of Palatine until 1202. As historian Attila Zsoldos proves by comparing with the previous allegations, Palatine Mika was not identical with his namesake, who served as ispán of Bihar County for several times in the 1210–20s.

References

Sources
  Markó, László (2006). A magyar állam főméltóságai Szent Istvántól napjainkig – Életrajzi Lexikon ("The High Officers of the Hungarian State from Saint Stephen to the Present Days – A Biographical Encyclopedia") (2nd edition); Helikon Kiadó Kft., Budapest; 
  Szőcs, Tibor (2014). A nádori intézmény korai története, 1000–1342 ("An Early History of the Palatinal Institution: 1000–1342"). Subsidia ad historiam medii aevi Hungariae inquirendam Vol. 5., Budapest; 
  Zsoldos, Attila (2011). Magyarország világi archontológiája, 1000–1301 ("Secular Archontology of Hungary, 1000–1301"). História, MTA Történettudományi Intézete. Budapest. 

12th-century Hungarian people
13th-century Hungarian people
Palatines of Hungary
Judges royal
Masters of the treasury (Kingdom of Hungary)
Date of birth unknown
Date of death unknown
People temporarily excommunicated by the Catholic Church
Founders of Christian monasteries